Pabstiella verboonenii is a species of orchid plant native to Brazil.

References 

verboonenii
Flora of Brazil